The Rent Act 1977 (c. 42) was an Act of Parliament passed in the United Kingdom. The Act introduced the protected tenancy in England and Wales.

The organization setting the rent, the Valuation Office Agency, was known as the "Rent Office".

See also
Rent regulation
English land law

References

External links

English property law
United Kingdom Acts of Parliament 1977
Acts of the Parliament of the United Kingdom concerning England and Wales
1977 in England
1977 in Wales
Britain
English land law
Regulation in the United Kingdom